Calgary-Bow is a provincial electoral district in the city of Calgary, Alberta, Canada. The district is one of 87 districts mandated to return a single member (MLA) to the Legislative Assembly of Alberta using the first past the post method of voting.

The electoral district has been a stronghold for right leaning parties. Social Credit briefly held the district from 1971 to 1975 and the Progressive Conservatives have held the district uninterrupted until the 2015 provincial election, when the seat was won by NDP candidate Deborah Drever. The electoral district returned to electing conservative candidate in 2019 with United Conservative Party MLA Demetrios Nicolaides.

History
The electoral district was created in the 1971 boundary re-distribution from Calgary West and Calgary Bowness.

The 2010 Alberta electoral district boundary re-distribution significantly changed the riding. The western boundaries were altered to conform to the new Calgary city limits which had been expanded since 2003. The riding lost all land that was east of Sarcee Trail and North of the Bow River to the electoral districts of Calgary-Currie and Calgary-Varsity. The district was also expanded south into land that used to be in Calgary-West up to the new south boundary of Bow Trail / 12 Street SW. The Calgary-Bow electoral district would have a population of 37,806, which was 7.5% below the provincial average of 40,880.

The 2017 Alberta electoral district boundary re-distribution saw the communities of Montgomery and Spruce Cliff added to the constituency. The boundaries as adjusted would give the electoral district a population of 51,358 in 2017, 10% above the provincial average of 46,803.

Boundary history

Representation history

The electoral district of Calgary-Bow was created in the 1971 boundary redistribution from the electoral districts of Calgary West and Calgary Bowness.

The election held that year was won by Social Credit candidate Roy Wilson. He won the district in a closely contested election over Progressive Conservative Bill Wearmouth taking just under half the popular vote. The win came despite the Social Credit party losing government that year. The race was reached a record for turnout in the district that hasn't been matched since.

Wilson ran for his second term in 1975 but was defeated by Progressive Conservative candidate Neil Webber. He would be re-elected with a landslide majority in 1979 and be appointed to the provincial cabinet under Peter Lougheed after the election.

Webber would be re-elected two more times in 1982 and 1986. He won the highest popular vote of his career and in the districts history in the 1982 election. Weber would keep his cabinet post after Don Getty became Premier in 1985 but he decided not to run for re-election and retired at dissolution.

After Wilson retired and the electoral district returned Progressive Conservative candidate Bonnie Laing who won a very close race over former Calgary Alderman Tim Bardsley in the 1986 election. She would hold the district for two more terms before retiring.

Alana DeLong was first elected to her first term in 2001 and has been returned twice more in the 2004 and 2008 elections.

Deborah Drever of the New Democratic Party of Alberta was the representative following the 2015 general election, which saw the provincial NDP under Rachel Notley defeat the Progressive Conservatives led by Premier Jim Prentice. Ms. Drever sat as an independent for 232 days during her term, arising from controversial social media posts. The current representative is Demetrios Niklaides of the United Conservative Party of Alberta, who defeated Ms. Drever in the 2019 general election.  Mr. Nikolaides was named the Minister of Advanced Education following the election and remains in that position. Former Calgary City Councillor Druh Farrell has indicated interest in running for the NDP in the 2023 general provincial election.

Legislature results

1971 general election

1975 general election

1979 general election

1982 general election

1986 general election

1989 general election

1993 general election

1997 general election

2001 general election

2004 general election

2008 general election

2012 general election

2015 general election

2019 general election

Senate nominee results

2004 Senate nominee election district results

Voters had the option of selecting 4 Candidates on the Ballot

2012 Senate nominee election district results

Student Vote results

2004 election

On November 19, 2004, a Student Vote was conducted at participating Alberta schools to parallel the 2004 Alberta general election results. The vote was designed to educate students and simulate the electoral process for persons who have not yet reached the legal majority. The vote was conducted in 80 of the 83 provincial electoral districts with students voting for actual election candidates. Schools with a large student body that reside in another electoral district had the option to vote for candidates outside of the electoral district then where they were physically located.

2012 election

See also
List of Alberta provincial electoral districts

References

External links
Elections Alberta
The Legislative Assembly of Alberta

Alberta provincial electoral districts
Politics of Calgary